Otto George "Tony" Fox (born c. 1934) was a rugby union player who represented Australia.

Fox, a wing, was born in Kogarah, New South Wales and claimed 1 international rugby cap for Australia on the Wallabies' 1957–58 Australia rugby union tour of Britain, Ireland and France.

References

Australian rugby union players
Australia international rugby union players
Living people
1934 births
Rugby union wings
Rugby union players from Sydney